Belgian Mexicans are Mexican citizens of Belgian descent or Belgium-born people living in Mexico.

History 
In the 16th century, Belgian tradespeople traveled to what would become present day Mexico. In 1537, Belgians began Mexico's first brewery. Flemish missionaries operated in the Valley of Mexico. The Augustinian Nic. de Witte tenaciously defended indigenous interests in the isolated highlands of Meztitlán (1543–63). During the 17th century, Jesuit missionaries originally from the Spanish Netherlands, moved among semi-nomads (Yaquis and Tarahumaras) in the inhospitable northern Mexico.

A cultural elite of artists and related professions supported evangelization with their artistic and didactic production. In addition to the importation of mass-produced Flemish works of art (Maerten de Vos), immigrant Flemish artists, almost all of whom were from Antwerp, worked in Mexico. Simon Pereyns (1568–89), initially a viceregal court painter, created large-scale altarpieces in various convents. The sculptor A.Suster (1563-1602) decorated the interior of several churches. Printer CA Cesar, alias Keyser, had a turbulent path. Finally, Diego de Borgraf (1640-'86) was the founder of the baroque-style “Pueblo School”. But after all, Flemish immigration to Mexico was never a massive phenomenon. Around 1650, when the flow stopped, there were only about 150 people.

Pedro de Gante, an Franciscan monk active between 1523 and 1572 who contributed to education of the indigenous peoples by very innovative means: he designed a catechism made of hieroglyphs, organized primary education, craft schools and artistic workshops and promotes the creation of hospitals for the Indians. His effigy appears at the foot of the statue of Christopher Columbus, erected on Avenida de la Reforma in Mexico City. The changes brought about by President Porfirio Díaz's liberal economic policies have made it possible to normalize the situation between the two countries. Starting in the 1830s, Belgian engineers worked in Mexico to build the first Mexican railroad with Belgian materials; there were even plans for a Nueva Bélgica, a colony to be built in Chihuahua. Once political relations were restored in 1879, the Belgian travelers tried to win public opinion in favor of Mexico. Because of this, Belgian traders, small industries, teachers and scientists began to immigrate to Mexico in a real 'bonanza atmosphere'. To set up flax cultivation in the state of Chihuahua, a new ambitious colonization project, “New Belgium”, was devised under the leadership of veteran Ch. Loomans (1884). For a hundred Belgian emigrants, however, this adventure ended in a fiasco.

Between 1885 and 1900, trade exchanges and capital investment with Mexico increased significantly. Exports to Antwerp mainly include products for agriculture, forestry and minerals. Belgium, for its part, mainly exports metal products, which in Mexico are used, for example, for the tram lines in Mérida or the town hall of Orizaba. But in the 1910s, the revolutionary turmoil again disrupts the success. The Belgian presence in the country drops to about 20 people and several companies went bankrupt. When the situation normalized in the course of the 1920s, Belgian enthusiasm for Mexico does not immediately return.

Notable people 
Jacqueline Bracamontes, actress
Bernard Jourdain, racing driver
Michel Jourdain Jr., racing driver
Michel Jourdain Sr., racing driver

See also
Belgium–Mexico relations

References 

European Mexican
Immigration to Mexico
 
Ethnic groups in Mexico